Marie Tudor is a 1912 French silent historical film directed by Albert Capellani and starring Jeanne Delvair, Paul Capellani and Romuald Joubé. The film is an adaptation of Victor Hugo's 1833 play of the same title set at the court of Mary I of England. It was re-released in 1917, and is sometimes dated to that year.

Cast
 Jeanne Delvair as Marie Tudor  
 Paul Capellani as Fabiano Fabiani  
 Romuald Joubé as Gilbert  
 Léon Bernard
 Andrée Pascal
 Léa Piron  
 Henri-Amédée Charpentier

References

Bibliography 
 Parrill, Sue & Robison, William B. The Tudors on Film and Television. McFarland, 2013.

External links 
 

1910s historical drama films
French historical drama films
French silent feature films
1910s French-language films
Films directed by Albert Capellani
French films based on plays
Films based on works by Victor Hugo
Films set in London
Films set in Tudor England
Films set in the 1550s
1912 films
Cultural depictions of Mary I of England
French black-and-white films
1912 drama films
Silent historical drama films
1910s French films